James Francis Smith (184427 October 1908) was an Australian politician.

He was born in Wellington to pastoralist William Smith and Mary Ann Williamson. He attended Christ Church School in Sydney and worked as a solicitor's clerk and then cattle dealer before establishing a butchery business around 1868. On 25 May 1868 he married Clara Linda Potter Leslie; they would have thirteen children.

Smith was a Newtown alderman from 1871 to 1908, serving four separate terms as mayor. In 1885 he was elected to the New South Wales Legislative Assembly as the member for Newtown. With the emergence of the first party system in the next few years, Smith gravitated to the Protectionist Party. He lost his seat in 1887 and continued to regularly contest elections until he was successful at winning the seat of Newtown-Camperdown in 1901. In 1904 he was re-elected as a Progressive in Camperdown, but he was defeated as an independent in 1907. Smith died at Newtown the following year.

References

 

1844 births
1908 deaths
Members of the New South Wales Legislative Assembly
Protectionist Party politicians
Independent members of the Parliament of New South Wales
People from the Central West (New South Wales)
Mayors of Newtown
19th-century Australian politicians